The following is the list of Award winners for the Karnataka State Puttanna Kanagal award. Kanagal was among the front runners in Kannada cinema's most successful film directors. In his memory and honor, this award is presented to the directors every year during the Karnataka State Awards function.

Recipients

See also
 Karnataka State Film Awards
 Karnataka State Film Award for Best Film

Notes

References

Karnataka State Film Awards
1986 establishments in Karnataka